The 2017 Southeastern Conference women's basketball tournament was a postseason women's basketball tournament for the Southeastern Conference held at Bon Secours Wellness Arena in Greenville, South Carolina, from March 1 through 5, 2017. South Carolina won their 3rd straight SEC tournament title and earned an automatic bid to the 2017 NCAA Women's Division I Basketball Tournament.

Seeds

Schedule

Bracket

See also

2017 SEC men's basketball tournament

References

External links
 

2016–17 Southeastern Conference women's basketball season
SEC women's basketball tournament
Basketball competitions in Greenville, South Carolina
2017 in sports in South Carolina
College basketball tournaments in South Carolina
Women's sports in South Carolina